Gymnoclytia occidua is a North American species of tachinid flies in the genus Gymnoclytia of the family Tachinidae.

Hosts
Larvae have been recorded from Pieris protodice & Pieris rapae (Lepidoptera) and Euschistus variolarius (Hemiptera).

Distribution
Michigan to Nova Scotia, southwest to Arizona, Mexico, and Georgia, Illinois to Virginia and Texas

References

External links
 Taxonomic & Host Catalogue of the Tachinidae of America North of Mexico

Phasiinae
Diptera of North America
Insects described in 1849